The 2016 Marist Red Foxes football team represented Marist College in the 2016 NCAA Division I FCS football season. They were led by 25th-year head coach Jim Parady and played their home games at Tenney Stadium at Leonidoff Field. They were members of the Pioneer Football League. They finished the season 5–6, 5–3 in PFL play to finish in fourth place.

Schedule

Source: Schedule

Game summaries

Bucknell

Georgetown

at Sacred Heart

Campbell

at Butler

at Morehead State

Davidson

San Diego

at Stetson

Dayton

at Jacksonville

References

Marist
Marist Red Foxes football seasons
Marist Red Foxes football